The Ingush diaspora refers to the community of Ingush people living outside of the Russian republic of Ingushetia, particularly in various regions of Russia, as well as in Europe, Central Asia, and the Middle East. It has a total of up to two hundred thousand people. It arose as a result of emigration and forced resettlement of the Ingush during various military and socio-political events and processes that took place in the second half of the 19th century, in the 20th century and in the first decade of the 21st century.

After the Caucasian War in 1865, some of the Ingush migrated (Muhajirism) to the Ottoman Empire. In total, 1,454 families moved from Ingushetia, in particular from two Ingush communities: Karabulak and Nazran. The descendants of those settlers form the Ingush diasporas in Turkey, Jordan, and Syria.

In the post-revolutionary period in Russia, some of the Ingush, who did not want to put up with the power of the Bolsheviks, emigrated to Europe. Among them were active public and political leaders of the North Caucasus Magomet Dzhabagiev, his brother Vassan-Girey Dzhabagiev, journalist Dzhemaldin Albogachiev, Colonel Murtazala Kuriev and many others. All of them were members of socio-political unions in Paris, Warsaw, Istanbul and Berlin and were engaged in publishing and journalistic activities. After the end of World War II, a second wave of emigration of representatives of the Ingush people to Europe followed.

On February 23, 1944, the entire Ingush people were forcibly evicted and sent into exile in Central Asia. In 1957, the deported peoples were allowed to return to their former place of residence. Most of the Ingush returned to their homeland, however, some remained to live in Kazakhstan and Kyrgyzstan.

Statistics by country 
Ingushes in Europe - 200,000
Ingushes in Turkey - 85,000
Ingushes in Syria - 35,000
 Ingushes in Jordan - 25,000

References 

Ingush diaspora